Scenic Rim is an electoral district of the Legislative Assembly in the Australian state of Queensland. It was created in the 2017 redistribution, and was won at the 2017 election by Jon Krause.

Located in South-East Queensland, Scenic Rim covers the Scenic Rim Region and some areas in the south of Ipswich and Logan extending to the New South Wales border, including the towns of Beaudesert and Boonah. It largely replaces the abolished district of Beaudesert.

From results of the 2015 election, Scenic Rim was estimated to be a fairly safe seat for the Liberal National Party with a margin of 9.2%.

Members for Scenic Rim

Election results

See also
 Electoral districts of Queensland
 Members of the Queensland Legislative Assembly by year
 :Category:Members of the Queensland Legislative Assembly by name

References

2017 establishments in Australia
Electoral districts of Queensland
Constituencies established in 2017